Troarn is a commune in the Calvados in the Normandy region in northwestern France. On 1 January 2017, it was merged into the new commune Saline, but this merger was undone on 31 December 2019.

Population

Sights
 The abbey founded by Roger de Montgomery in 1059

See also
Communes of the Calvados department

References

Communes of Calvados (department)
Calvados communes articles needing translation from French Wikipedia